Goniurellia is a genus of tephritid  or fruit flies in the family Tephritidae.

Species
Goniurellia apicalis Merz, 2002
Goniurellia ebejeri Merz, 2002
Goniurellia lacerata (Becker, 1913)
Goniurellia longicauda Freidberg, 1980
Goniurellia munroi Freidberg, 1980
Goniurellia octoradiata Merz, 2002
Goniurellia omissa Freidberg, 1980
Goniurellia persignata Freidberg, 1980
Goniurellia spinifera Freidberg, 1980
Goniurellia tridens (Hendel, 1910)

References

Tephritinae
Tephritidae genera
Diptera of Africa
Diptera of Asia
Diptera of Europe